In enzymology, a 6-aminohexanoate-cyclic-dimer hydrolase is an enzyme that catalyzes the chemical reaction

1,8-diazacyclotetradecane-2,9-dione + H2O  N-(6-aminohexanoyl)-6-aminohexanoate

Thus, the two substrates of this enzyme are 1,8-diazacyclotetradecane-2,9-dione and H2O, whereas its product is N-(6-aminohexanoyl)-6-aminohexanoate.

This enzyme belongs to the family of hydrolases, those acting on carbon-nitrogen bonds other than peptide bonds, specifically in cyclic amides.  The systematic name of this enzyme class is 1,8-diazacyclotetradecane-2,9-dione lactamhydrolase.

References

External links

EC 3.5.2
Enzymes of unknown structure